Gunnar Henry Asmussen (born 10 May 1944) is a retired Danish amateur cyclist. He won a gold medal in the track team pursuit at the 1968 Summer Olympics and placed 13th in 1972. Asmussen held national titles both in the road race (1964–65, 1971) and track team pursuit (1969–71, 1974 and 1976).

References 

1944 births
Living people
Cyclists at the 1968 Summer Olympics
Cyclists at the 1972 Summer Olympics
Olympic cyclists of Denmark
Olympic gold medalists for Denmark
Danish male cyclists
Olympic medalists in cycling
Sportspeople from Aarhus
Medalists at the 1968 Summer Olympics
Danish track cyclists